The Haier T20 Cup 2014-15 was the eleventh season of the National T20 Cup in Pakistan, sponsored by Haier. The tournament started on September 17, 2014 at Karachi which was relocated from Multan due to torrential rains and flooding in Punjab. A total of 18 Teams divided into four groups participated in this tournament.

Venue

Teams

Tournament
The tournament was scheduled to be held between 17 and 28 September 2014. Tournament is a Round Robin and Knockout tournament.

Group stage

Group A

Group B

Group C

Group D

Knockout stage

Semi-finals

Final

Statistics

References

2014–15 National T20 Cup
2014 in Pakistani cricket
2015 in Pakistani cricket
Domestic cricket competitions in 2014–15
Pakistani cricket seasons from 2000–01